Karl Bartos (born 31 May 1952) is a German musician and composer known for his contributions to the electronic band Kraftwerk.

Career
Karlheinz Bartos was born on 31 May 1952 in Marktschellenberg, Germany, named after his grandfathers Karl and Heinz. He was the drummer in a college band called The Jokers (later The Jolly Jokers in 1975) as Carlos Bartos, around 1965 to 1975. Between 1975 and 1991, he was, along with Wolfgang Flür, a member of the electronic music band Kraftwerk. This lineup of the group remains the most stable and productive yet assembled. He was originally recruited to play on Kraftwerk's US "Autobahn" tour where he changed his name to "Karl", as the band member's names were displayed on stage in neon lighting; "Karlheinz" was deemed too long and thus too expensive by Kraftwerk's front man Ralf Hütter. In addition to his percussion playing, Bartos was credited with songwriting on the Man-Machine, Computer World, and Electric Café albums and sang one lead vocal on the latter.

Bartos left Kraftwerk in August 1990, reportedly frustrated at the band's slow progress in their activities due to the increasingly perfectionist attitude of founding members Ralf Hütter and Florian Schneider. Karl Bartos hinted at this fact in the interview entitled "I was a Robot", which is a part of the documentary film "Kraftwerk and the Electronic Revolution".

In 1992 Bartos founded Elektric Music. This new project released the Kraftwerk-style Esperanto in 1993, and then the more guitar-based Electric Music in 1998. In between the two albums, Bartos collaborated with Bernard Sumner and Johnny Marr on Electronic's 1996 album Raise the Pressure, and co-wrote material with Andy McCluskey of OMD, which appeared on both Esperanto and OMD's Universal album. In 1998, he also produced an album by Swedish synth-pop band the Mobile Homes, much in the style of his work with Electronic: guitar-pop with very slight synthetic references. It was received as a great disappointment to synth-pop fans, but it sold more than any of their previous albums and was used in an advert for an airline.

In 1992 Elektric Music were asked to remix Afrika Bambaataa's song "Planet Rock" for release on a remix album. Planet Rock was the subject of an out-of-court settlement between Kraftwerk and Tommy Boy Records head Tom Silverman, as it uses significant parts from both Kraftwerk's "Trans-Europe Express" and "Numbers".

In 2003, using his own name, he released the synth-pop album Communication, featuring such songs as "I'm the Message," "Camera," and "Ultraviolet."

In 2007 his music provided the soundtrack to the documentary Moebius Redux – A Life in Pictures, about the graphic artist Jean Giraud.

Karl Bartos announced in early 2008 that he had opened the first edition of the audio-visual exhibition Crosstalk for public viewing at the white cube section on the official Karl Bartos website. The program holds 21 films, remixes, cover versions, and mash-ups from Sweden, Belgium, the Netherlands, Germany, United Kingdom, the USA, and Japan.

In March 2011, Karl Bartos released Mini-Composer, an iPhone app. It's a simple 16 steps sequencer with 4 basic waves synthesizer. It has been designed with Japanese artist Masayuki Akamatsu and the executive producer is Jean-Marc Lederman.

On 15 March 2013 he released his next studio album, Off the Record, preceded by "Atomium" the first single taken from it. The 7" version, released worldwide on 1 February 2013, was limited to 1,000 copies.

In September 2020, the official Karl Bartos email newsletter announced that Karl is currently working on a new project and intends to present this work live once the covid-19 pandemic slows down.

On 12 May 2021, Kraftwerk was announced as one of the inductees of the Rock and Roll Hall of Fame with Bartos being one of the inductees along with Schneider, Hütter and Flür.

Discography
With Kraftwerk
1975: Radio-Activity
1977: Trans-Europe Express
1978: The Man-Machine
1981: Computer World
1983: Tour de France (single)
1986: Electric Café
1991: The Mix (sound-data programming, uncredited)

With Elektric Music (now Electric Music)
1992: Afrika Bambaataa and The Soulsonic Force – Planet Rock (Classic Mix)
1993: Esperanto
1998: Electric Music

With Electronic
1996: Raise the Pressure

As Karl Bartos
2003: Communication (GER #85; SWE #30)
2013: Off the Record (GER #44; SWE #47; BE (Vl) #161)
2016: Communication

Singles:
2000: "15 Minutes of Fame"
2003: "I'm The Message"
2004: "Camera Obscura"
2013: "Atomium"
2016: "Life"
2016: "I'm The Message (Matthew Herbert's Doctor Rockit Mix)"
2016: "15 Minutes of Fame"

Unreleased
1994: 2nd proposed Elektric Music album (Most of the songs were performed at Elektric Music's Virtual Summer Tour in 1994).
2007: Moebius Redux – Ein Leben in Bildern / Une vie en images / A Life in Pictures (original soundtrack)

Bibliography
2012: "Kraftwerk: Publikation" – preface (Omnibus Press)
2017: "Der Klang der Maschine: Autobiografie"
2022: "The Sound of the Machine: My Life in Kraftwerk and Beyond" (Omnibus Press)

See also
Influenced drummers or rhythm composers

References

External links
 
 artist information/discography page at CyberNoise
 Karl Bartos Interview (English)
 Karl Bartos Interview (Deutsch)
 Karl Bartos channel at YouTube

1952 births
Living people
Kraftwerk members
German rock drummers
Male drummers
German male musicians
Atlantic Records artists
Columbia Records artists
German electronic musicians
People from Berchtesgaden
Robert Schumann Hochschule alumni
Electronic (band) members